Pandemis electrochroa is a species of moth of the  family Tortricidae. It is found on La Réunion.

References

	

Moths described in 1977
Pandemis